Natalya Nikolayevna Belokhvostikova (July 28, 1951 in Moscow, USSR) is a retired Soviet and Russian actress. She was awarded the title People's Artist of Russia in 1984.

Biography
Natalia Belokhvostikova was born July 28, 1951 in Moscow in the family of a diplomat.

Belohvostikova's cinematic debut took place in 1965, when she appeared in a crowd scene in the Mark Donskoy film A Mother's Heart.

In 1968, she entered the VGIK into the acting studio of Sergei Gerasimov and Tamara Makarova. While still a student, she played in the film of her teacher Gerasimov By the Lake. For the role of Lena Barmina, Belokhvostikova was awarded the State Prize of the USSR (1971), becoming the youngest laureate.

After graduation from VGIK in 1971, Natalia became an actress of the Theater-Studio of the actor. In the same year she played the part of Anna Snegina in Sergey Urusevsky's Sing a Song, Poet. In 1976, Belokhvostikova starred in Gerasimov's film adaptation of Stendhal's novel The Red and the Black in the role of Matilda de la Mole, and in 1979 by Mikhail Schweitzer as Donna Anna in Little Tragedies.

Her best roles are related to the work of the directors Alexander Alov and Vladimir Naumov - Nele in The Legend of Thiele (1976), Natalie and Marie in Teheran 43 (1980), Emma in Beach (1984), Lena in Ten Years Without the Right of Correspondence (1990).

The role in the film Teheran 43 brought the actress all-union fame. For participation in the film Beach in 1985 she received the State Prize of the USSR.

In 1984, Natalia Belokhvostikova was awarded the title People's Artist of the RSFSR.

Belokhvostikova continues to work in film and television. Among her most recent works are the films Clock without Hands (2001), The Year of the Horse: the Scorpion Constellation (2004), The Gioconda on the Asphalt (2007), In Russia it's snowing (2010).

In 2006, the actress was awarded the Order of Merit for the Fatherland IV degree.

Personal life
Natalia Belokhvostikova's husband is director Vladimir Naumov. They have a daughter, Natalia Naumova, who is an actress and director.

Partial filmography
 By the Lake  (У озера, 1970) as Lena Barmina
 Nadezhda (Надежда, 1973) as Nadezhda Krupskaya
 Sing a Song, Poet (Пой песню, поэт 1973) as Anna Snegina
 Ocean (1974) as Anechka
 The Legend of Till Ullenspiegel (Легенда о Тиле, 1976) as Nele
 The Red and the Black as Matilda de la Mole
 A Glass of Water (Стакан воды, 1979) as Anne, Queen of England
 Little Tragedies (Маленькие трагедии, 1979) as Donna Anna
 Nezvanyy drug (Незваный друг 1981)
 Tegeran-43 (Тегеран-43, 1981) as Marie Louni / Nathalie
 The Circus Princess (Принцесса цирка, 1982) as Countess Palinskaya
  (1983)
 Beach (Берег 1984) as Emma Herbert
  (1985)
 Zmeyelov (1985)
 Legal Marriage (Законный брак 1986)
 Choice (Выбор 1987) as Mariya / Veronika Vasilyeva
  (Zakon 1989) 
 Ten Years Without Right to Write Letters (Десять лет без права переписки, 1990) as Nina
  (1991)
  (1991)
  (1992) 
 White Feast (Белый праздник 1994)
 Tayna Marchello (Тайна Марчелло 1997)
  (2010)

References

External links

1951 births
Living people
Actresses from Moscow
Soviet film actresses
Russian film actresses
20th-century Russian actresses
Recipients of the USSR State Prize
Gerasimov Institute of Cinematography alumni
Academicians of the National Academy of Motion Picture Arts and Sciences of Russia
People's Artists of the RSFSR
Recipients of the Order of Honour (Russia)
Recipients of the Order "For Merit to the Fatherland", 4th class